In Māori mythology, Tiki is the first man created by either Tūmatauenga or Tāne. He found the first woman, Marikoriko, in a pond; she seduced him and he became the father of Hine-kau-ataata. By extension, a tiki is a large or small wooden, pounamu or stone carving in humanoid form, notably worn on the neck as a hei-tiki, although this is a somewhat archaic usage in the Māori language. Hei-tiki are often considered taonga, especially if they are older and have been passed down throughout multiple generations. Carvings similar to ngā tiki and coming to represent deified ancestors are found in most Polynesian cultures. They often serve to mark the boundaries of sacred or significant sites. In the Western world, Tiki culture, a movement inspired by various Pacific cultures, has become popular in the 20th and 21st centuries; this has proven controversial, however, as the movement is regarded by many Polynesians as cultural appropriation.

Religion
In traditions from the West Coast of the South Island of New Zealand, the first human is a woman created by Tāne, god of forests and of birds. Usually her name is Hine-ahu-one. In other legends, Tāne makes the first man, Tiki, then makes a wife for him. In some West Coast versions, Tiki himself, as a son of Rangi and Papa, creates the first human by mixing his own blood with clay, and Tāne then makes the first woman. Sometimes Tūmatauenga, the war god, creates Tiki. In another story the first woman is Mārikoriko. Tiki marries her and their daughter is Hine-kau-ataata. In some traditions, Tiki is the penis of Tāne. In fact, Tiki is strongly associated with the origin of the reproductive act.

In one story of Tiki among the many variants, Tiki was lonely and craved company. One day, seeing his reflection in a pool, he thought he had found a companion, and dived into the pool to seize it. The image shattered and Tiki was disappointed. He fell asleep and when he awoke he saw the reflection again. He covered the pool with earth and it gave birth to a woman. Tiki lived with her in serenity, until one day the woman was excited by an eel. Her excitement passed to Tiki and the first reproductive act resulted.

Names and epithets

John White names several Tiki or perhaps manifestations of Tiki in Māori tradition:
 Tiki-tohua, the progenitor of birds
 Tiki-kapakapa, the progenitor of fish and of a bird, the tui
 Tiki-auaha, the progenitor of humanity
 Tiki-whakaeaea, the progenitor of the kūmara.

Elsewhere in Polynesia
The word appears as tiki in New Zealand Māori, Cook Islands Māori, Tuamotuan, and Marquesan; as tii in Tahitian, and as kii in Hawaiian. The word has not been recorded from the languages of Western Polynesia or in the Rapa Nui language.
 In Hawaiian traditions the first man was Kumuhonua. He was made by Kāne, or by Kāne, Kū, and Lono. His body was made by mixing red earth with saliva. He was made in the shape of Kāne, who carried the earth from which the man was made from the four corners of the world. A woman was made from one of his ribs. Kanaloa was watching when Kāne made the first man, and he too made a man, but could not bring him to life. Kanaloa then said to Kāne, “I will take your man, and he will die.” And so death came upon mankind.
 In Tahiti, Tii was the first man, and was made from red earth. The first woman was Ivi who was made from one of the bones (ivi) of Tii.
 In the Marquesas Islands, there are various accounts. In one legend Atea and his wife created people. In another tradition Atanua and her father Atea brought forth humans.
 In the Cook Islands, traditions also vary. At Rarotonga, Tiki is the guardian of the entrance to Avaiki, the underworld. Offerings were made to him as gifts for the departing soul of someone who is dying. At Mangaia, Tiki is a woman, the sister of Veetini, the first person to die a natural death. The entrance to Avaiki (the underworld) is called ‘the chasm of Tiki’.
 According to Easter Island (Rapa Nui) legend, Hotu Matu'a, the first chief brought along a moai (other traditional sources mention two) symbolizing ancestors, which became the model for the large moai. Dr. Jo Anne van Tilburg of the Easter Island Statue Project at UCLA says that the first stone statues originated on Rapa Nui, although oral traditions do not support this. Others contend that the first statues originated in the Marquesas or the Austral Islands.

See also

 Hei-tiki, Māori neck pendants, often called tiki
 Moai, a monolithic human figure on Easter Island, sometimes erroneously called tiki
 Tiki culture, a 20th-century decorative style used in Polynesian-themed restaurants
 Taotao, similar carvings of ancestral and nature spirits in the Philippine islands
 Totem pole, artworks similar in shape and purpose from Cascadian cultures
 Chemamull, Mapuche statues
 Walt Disney's Enchanted Tiki Room, a famous Audio-Animatronic attraction in Disneyland, Magic Kingdom (Walt Disney World) and Tokyo Disneyland.

Footnotes

References

Polynesian mythology
Polynesian words and phrases
Polynesian culture
Legendary Māori people
Legendary progenitors
Religious objects
Austronesian spirituality
Mythological first humans